Tristaniopsis razakiana is a species of plant in the family Myrtaceae, formerly known as Tristania razakiana.

It is a terrestrial plant endemic to the montane forests of Peninsular Malaysia. There is a documented population on Fraser's Hill, but development there threatens the species with habitat loss.

References

razakiana
Endemic flora of Peninsular Malaysia
Conservation dependent plants
Taxonomy articles created by Polbot